Gatton National Park is a national park in South East Queensland, Australia.

The park occupies the north east corner of Woodlands near Gatton in the Lockyer Valley Region.  Gatton National Park lies within the Lockyer Creek water catchment and experiences a sub-tropical climate.

The Gatton Glenore Grove Rifle Club operates a rifle range over a section of the park on most Saturdays. Warning signs are placed for visitors prior.

See also

Protected areas of Queensland

References

National parks of South East Queensland